Weyinmi Efejuku Rose (born September 15, 1986) is a Jamaican professional basketball player who currently plays for Mets de Guaynabo of the FIBA Americas League. 

He was born in New York, New York. He has played for Providence Friars men's basketball and attended Brewster Academy. Led by coach Eddie Casiano, he helped the Indios de Mayagüez win the Baloncesto Superior Nacional championship in 2012.

Awards and honors
2008–09 season
 2009 All-Big East Honorable Mention
 2009 USBWA All-District 1
 2009 Jimmy Walker Most Valuable Player Award
 March 2: Big East Player of the Week

References

External links
 Weyinmi Efejuku at eurobasket.com
 Weyinmi Efejuku at fiba.com
 Weyinmi Efejuku at realgm.com
 

1986 births
Living people
American sportspeople of Jamaican descent
Atenas basketball players
Basketball players from New York City
BC Zaporizhya players
BK Ventspils players
Basketball Nymburk players
Fuerza Guinda de Nogales players
Fuerza Regia de Monterrey players
Indios de Mayagüez basketball players
Jamaican expatriate basketball people in Argentina
Jamaican expatriate basketball people in Italy
Jamaican expatriate basketball people in Mexico
Jamaican expatriate basketball people in the United States
Jamaican men's basketball players
Juvecaserta Basket players
Lega Basket Serie A players
Leones de Ponce basketball players
Point guards
Providence Friars men's basketball players
Sportspeople from Queens, New York
Tenerife CB players